HBO Boxing is a video game developed by Osiris Studios and published by Acclaim Entertainment under its Acclaim Sports label for the PlayStation in 2000.

Reception

The game received "generally unfavorable reviews" according to the review aggregation website Metacritic. Rob Smolka of NextGen said, "With a bit of control-tweaking and a complete graphics overhaul, this may show some promise in the future incarnations. For now it's just an also-ran." The Electric Playground gave it a favorable review, a few weeks before it was released Stateside.

References

External links
 

2000 video games
Acclaim Entertainment games
Boxing on HBO
Boxing video games
PlayStation (console) games
PlayStation (console)-only games
Video games developed in the United States